Chlamydacanthus is a genus of flowering plants belonging to the family Acanthaceae.

Its native range is Eastern Tropical Africa, Madagascar.

Species:

Chlamydacanthus euphorbioides 
Chlamydacanthus lindavianus 
Chlamydacanthus rupestris

References

Acanthaceae
Acanthaceae genera